Fuchsia × bacillaris is a natural hybrid between F. microphylla subsp. microphylla and F. thymifolia subsp. thymifolia. It was originally described by John Lindley in 1832. It is native to Mexico, including the states of Mexico, Oaxaca, and Puebla.

References

Flora of Oaxaca
Flora of Puebla
Flora of the State of Mexico
bacillaris
Plants described in 1832
Hybrid plants